The Frequency of INherited Disorders database (FINDbase) is a database of frequencies of causative genetic variations worldwide. FINDbase was founded in 2006 to be a relational database for these frequencies of causative genetic variations of inherited genetic disorders, as well as pharmacogenetic markers. Out of all the national/ethnic mutation databases (NEMDBs), FINDbase has the most content and since all the entries are collected from various populations worldwide, it is seen as a great resource for population-specific information.

See also
 Genetic variation

References

External links
 http://www.findbase.org

Genetics databases
Population genetics